Hagerty is a surname.

Hagerty may also refer to:

Places
 Hagerty House, Marshall, Texas, USA; an NRHP-listed building
 Josephine M. Hagerty House (Hagerty House), Cohasset, Massachusetts, USA; an NRHP-listed building
 Paul J. Hagerty High School, Oviedo, Florida, USA

Other uses
 Hagerty (Insurance), a U.S. automotive insurance company
 Hagerty Incident (1960 June 10), part of the Anpo Protests

See also

 
 Haggarty (surname)
 Haggerty (surname)
 Heggarty (surname)

 Hagarty (surname)
 Hegarty (surname)
 Hegerty (surname)